In organic chemistry, transamidification is the process of exchanging the subunits of a peptide, amide or ester compound with another amine or fatty acid to produce a new amide or peptide. The process has been used for the production of emulsifiers and dispersing agents and oil drilling fluids.

See also
Transalkylation
Transesterification

References

Substitution reactions